San Pedro Bay is a bay in the Philippines, at the northwest end of Leyte Gulf, about 15 km east–west and 20 km north–south. The bay is bounded by two islands; on the north and east by Samar, and on the east by Leyte. It is connected by San Juanico Strait to Carigara Bay of the Samar Sea. The largest city on the bay is Tacloban City, the capital of Leyte province.

During World War II the Bay was part of a large US Navy base Leyte-Samar Naval Base.

Bays of the Philippines
Landforms of Leyte (province)
Landforms of Samar (province)